Victoria Bosio (born 3 October 1994) is an inactive Argentine tennis player.

Bosio has won four singles and ten doubles titles on the ITF Women's Circuit.

On 17 December 2018, she reached her best singles ranking of world No. 308. On 7 March 2022, she peaked at No. 284 in the WTA doubles rankings.

Playing for Argentina Fed Cup team, Bosio has a win–loss record of 4–5.

ITF Circuit finals

Singles: 20 (4 titles, 16 runner–ups)

Doubles: 30 (10 titles, 20 runner–ups)

Fed Cup participation

Doubles

Notes

References

External links
 
 
 

1994 births
Living people
Sportspeople from Santa Fe, Argentina
Argentine female tennis players
Tennis players at the 2019 Pan American Games
Pan American Games competitors for Argentina
21st-century Argentine women